Charles James Smith (26 August 1915 – 31 March 1984) was a Welsh professional footballer who played in the Football League for Torquay United and Exeter City as an outside right. He also played in the Scottish League for Aberdeen.

Career statistics

Honours 
Aberdeen

 Dewar Shield: 1939–40

References 

English Football League players
Association football fullbacks
Welsh footballers
Footballers from Cardiff
1915 births
1984 deaths
Exeter City F.C. players
Yeovil Town F.C. players
Southern Football League players
Aberdeen F.C. players
Scottish Football League players
Torquay United F.C. players
Clapton Orient F.C. wartime guest players